Minneapolis and St. Louis Railroad Depot may refer to:

Minneapolis and St. Louis Railroad Depot (Belview, Minnesota), listed on the National Register of Historic Places in Redwood County, Minnesota
Minneapolis and St. Louis Railroad Depot (Aberdeen, South Dakota), listed on the National Register of Historic Places in Brown County, South Dakota
Minneapolis and St. Louis Railroad Depot (Watertown, South Dakota), listed on the National Register of Historic Places in Codington County, South Dakota